Estonian Council of Churches (ECC) is an Estonian organisation which unites and promotes co-operation between Christian churches and congregations in Estonia.

ECC president is Andres Põder.

ECC is an associate member of Conference of European Churches.

ECC members
ECC has 10 members:
Estonian Evangelical Lutheran Church
Union of Evangelical Christian and Baptist Churches of Estonia
Estonian Methodist Church
Roman Catholic Church
Estonian Christian Pentecostal Church
Estonian Conference of Seventh-day Adventists Church
Estonian Congregation St. Gregory of the Armenian Apostolic Church
Orthodox Church of Estonia
Estonian Orthodox Church of Moscow Patriarchate
Charismatic Episcopal Church of Estonia.

References

External links

Christianity in Estonia
Organizations based in Estonia